John B. White was an insurance businessman and state legislator in Oklahoma. He served in the Oklahoma House of Representatives in 1964. He advocated for public housing legislation. In 1966 he campaigned for a state senate seat against Edward Melvin Porter. He, Archibald B. Hill, and Curtis Lawson were the first African Americans elected to the Oklahoma Legislature after 1908. He was a Democrat.

See also
30th Oklahoma Legislature

References

External links

Democratic Party members of the Oklahoma House of Representatives
Year of birth missing
Year of death missing
Businesspeople from Oklahoma
African-American businesspeople
American businesspeople in insurance
20th-century African-American politicians
20th-century American politicians
20th-century American businesspeople